Weird World may refer to:

 Weird World (magazine), a British pulp magazine published in 1955 and 1956
 Weird World, an imprint of Domino Recording Company
 "Weird World", a song on 2005 album Never Gone by Backstreet Boys